Billeting Order (French: Le billet de logement) is a 1932 French comedy film directed by Charles-Félix Tavano and starring André Berley, Jeanne Helbling and Lucienne Parizet.

The film's sets were designed by the art director Robert-Jules Garnier.

Cast
 André Berley as Labourdette  
 Jeanne Helbling as Madame veuve Martin  
 Lucienne Parizet as Paulette  
 Georges Melchior as Le colonel  
 Lucien Gallas as Champeaux  
 Arielle as Madame Dingois  
 Simone Judic as Zulma Martin  
 Jeanne de Carol as Madame Savoureux  
 Germaine Baron as Paulette Martin  
 Pierre Finaly as Dingois  
 Pierre Darteuil as L'ordonnance Moulard  
 Harry Krimer as Lieutenant de Fréville  
 Gustave Hamilton as Frère Dingois  
 Albert Broquin as Filerin 
 Germaine Brière 
 Jean Neyris 
 Yvonne Reyville

References

Bibliography 
 Crisp, Colin. Genre, Myth and Convention in the French Cinema, 1929-1939. Indiana University Press, 2002.

External links 
 

1932 films
1932 comedy films
French comedy films
1930s French-language films
Films directed by Charles-Félix Tavano
French black-and-white films
1930s French films